A pie shop is a take away (fast food) outlet specialising in pies, especially meat pies. Common in some parts of the United Kingdom and Australia.

A form of specialised bakery, or in more recent times purely a retail outlet selling reheated cooked pies, pie shops in Australia usually sell meat pies, sausage rolls, pasties and other pastry-wrapped baked goods. The growth of hot bread shops (direct sale bakeries, often franchises) in Australia has largely supplanted the specialist pie shop.

See also 
 Square Pie

References

Food retailing
Pies